Sundowning is the debut full-length studio album by English rock band Sleep Token. Recorded at G1 Productions in Wells, Somerset, it was produced by George Lever and released on 21 November 2019 as the band's first release on Spinefarm Records.

Background
After releasing three standalone singles ("Jaws", a cover of Outkast's "Hey Ya", and "The Way That You Were") in 2018, Sleep Token signed with Universal Music Group label Spinefarm Records in 2019. Alongside the announcement of the deal in June, the band also announced Sundowning and released the opening song from the album, "The Night Does Not Belong to God". Every two weeks after this, the next song on the album's track listing was released on YouTube at the time of sunset in the United Kingdom. Each track was given its own emblem and accompanying visualiser, all of which contributed to the lore of the album.

On 20 June 2020, seven months after the album's initial release and the day of the summer solstice, Sleep Token issued a deluxe version of Sundowning containing four bonus tracks performed entirely on piano dubbed The Room Below. The four tracks were a new version of the album's closing track "Blood Sport" (for which a music video was also released), a new track entitled "Shelter", and cover versions of Billie Eilish's "When the Party's Over" and Whitney Houston's "I Wanna Dance with Somebody (Who Loves Me)". On 20 March 2022, the vernal equinox, an instrumental version of the original 12-track album was released.

As of March 2023, according to Setlist.fm, "The Offering" is the song performed live most times by the band; "Higher" is ranked second, with "The Night Does Not Belong to God", "Dark Signs" and "Sugar" also in the top ten from Sundowning.

Reception

Sundowning received generally positive reviews from music critics. Distorted Sound magazine's Daniel Fella gave the album a perfect 10/10 rating, praising it for providing a "dense palette" featuring "sheer beauty". Fella claimed that Sundowning served as a "redefinition" of heavy music, praising various elements of the tracks therein and predicting that its release would lead to "a storm of well deserved success" for the band. Reviewing the album for Kerrang!, Tom Shepherd gave Sundowning a rating of four out of five, writing that the record features "moments here to truly savour, and ideas and experiences that feel unique". Shepherd highlighted in particular the songs "The Offering", "Dark Signs" abd "Drag Me Under", but also noted that "the continuous nature of this dark mood entwined with the group's slow-burning, listless pace does begin to drag across [the album's] 50-minute runtime".

At the end of 2019, Distorted Sound ranked Sundowning as the second best album of the year (behind only Samsara by Venom Prison), with Dan McHugh writing that "Sundowning has proved that [Sleep Token] are not just a flash in the pan with its spellbinding experimentation ... the combined product is a force to be reckoned with". In a feature published shortly after the release of the first four singles from Take Me Back to Eden in January 2023, Metal Hammer included "Gods" and "The Offering" in its list of Sleep Token's best songs.

Track listing

Personnel
Vessel1 – vocals, guitar, keyboards, piano
Vessel2 – drums
George Lever – production, engineering, bass

References

External links

2019 albums
Sleep Token albums
Spinefarm Records albums